Anton Kubala (born 4 December 1981) is a Slovak Footballer.

Kubala was a member of the Slovakia youth teams, appearing for the Slovakia national U15, U16, U17, U18.

References

1981 births
Living people
People from Levice
Sportspeople from the Nitra Region
Slovak footballers
Slovakia youth international footballers
Slovak expatriate footballers
Slovak expatriate sportspeople in Thailand
Expatriate footballers in Thailand
Slovak expatriate sportspeople in Malaysia
Expatriate footballers in Malaysia
FK Slovan Levice players
AS Trenčín players
FC DAC 1904 Dunajská Streda players
ŠK Eldus Močenok players
Association football midfielders